Kharkiv TEC-5 is a combined heat and power plant (CHP) near Podvirky village in Kharkiv Raion of Kharkiv Oblast, Ukraine. It is the second largest CHP plant in Ukraine. It has a capacity of 540 MW of electric power and up to 1,650 MW of heat power.

The power plant is owned and operated by JSC Kharkiv CHPP-5, a subsidiary of Naftogaz Ukrainy.

History 

The TEC-5 power plant was built in the 1970s under the political system and jurisdiction of the Soviet Union.

On 11 September 2022, in response to the 2022 Ukrainian Kharkiv counteroffensive, the Russian Armed Forces struck the plant with Kalibr cruise missiles. This caused extensive power outages in Kharkiv, Dnipro, Sumy Oblast and Poltava.

References

External links

 
 http://tec5.kharkov.ua/Ukr/index.php
 http://www.skyscraperpage.com/diagrams/?b7189
 

Energy infrastructure completed in 1979
Towers completed in 1979
Natural gas-fired power stations in Ukraine
Oil-fired power stations in Ukraine
Chimneys in Ukraine
Companies based in Kharkiv
Cogeneration power stations in Ukraine
Power stations built in the Soviet Union